The GT Challenge at VIR is a sports car race held at the Virginia International Raceway in Alton, Virginia, since 1957.  After being a part of the SCCA National Sports Car Championship and the IMSA GT Championship the race, along with the track, went on hiatus from the early 1970s until 2002.  It returned as a round of the Rolex Sports Car Series, and became an American Le Mans Series race in 2012. In 2014 the race joined the schedule of the United SportsCar Championship after the merger of the American Le Mans Series and the Rolex Sports Car Series.

The race length has varied from 150 to 500 km. The former title VIR 240 refers to the duration of 240 minutes (4 hours).  In 2013, the race was renamed the Oak Tree Grand Prix.

Beginning in 2016, the Oak Tree Grand Prix became the name of the Continental Tire SportsCar Challenge support race run on the same weekend as the United SportsCar Championship Michelin GT Challenge at VIR.

Winners

References

External links
Racing Sports Cars: VIR archive
Ultimate Racing History: VIR archive

 
Recurring sporting events established in 1957